Capinota is one of sixteen provinces in the Cochabamba Department, Bolivia. Its capital is the city of Capinota. The province has a projected population over 33,000 inhabitants by 2017. Capinota has three sections and the most populous is Capinota section, followed by Santivanes.

Subdivision 
Capinota Province is divided into three municipalities which are further subdivided into cantons.

See also 
 Kuntur Wachana
 Puka Mayu
 Waña Quta

References

External links
 Map of Capinota Province
 Official website
Province Capinota homepage

Provinces of Cochabamba Department